TET/PRAO (Työelämään tutustuminen in Finnish, Praktisk arbetslivsorientering in Swedish, lit. work life orientation) is a program providing one to three weeks of experience working in a real job during middle school (lower secondary education) in Finland and Sweden.

The program is one to three weeks long and takes place in 7th, 8th or 9th grade, depending on the school. Each student can choose and apply to their work independently and has to sign a contract with both the school and the employer. Often students end up working with a relative or friend.

Students working in the program are normally entitled to one free meal per day, but they receive no salary or allowance. Costs incurred by the employer are paid by the Finnish/Swedish state.

The purpose of the program is to introduce students to real-life working environments. TET students normally have a six-hour workday, with only one mandatory 30-minute lunch break. Rules require that no heavy lifting (over 15 kg) be part of normal labour, and there are other specifications.

See also
 Community service
 Internship
 Work experience

Education in Finland
Education in Sweden